Geoffrey S. Knauth is a software engineer, and currently serves as president of the Free Software Foundation since August 2020.

FSF activities
Knauth joined the Free Software Foundation (FSF) Board of Directors in 1998 as treasurer. He is also co-founder of the GNU Objective-C project. On August 5, 2020,  Knauth was elected as president of FSF,  11 months following the resignation of Richard Stallman, who had been its founding president since 1985.

In March 25 2021 Geoffrey Knauth promised to resign from being a voting member of the FSF once there was suitable leadership to replace him.

Academic background
Knauth received a artium baccalaureus (A.B. or Bachelor of Arts) degree from Harvard University in 1983 in Economics. He also took many courses on Slavic languages and literatures there. Later in the late 1980s and 2000s he also took additional computer science and language courses both at Harvard and Northeastern University. In 2006-2010 he served as a Computer Science Instructor at Lycoming College.

Professional experience
Knauth has been employed by various companies, in various roles including programmer, senior associate, systems engineer, and systems analyst. Knauth is currently employed by AccuWeather Inc. as a Senior Software Developer since March 2014.

Personal life
Knauth is fluent in English, Russian and French, with some knowledge of German and Chinese. He is also a pilot and has been involved with rowing and various other activities.

See also
 John Sullivan, former executive director of FSF
 Richard Stallman, former president of FSF

References

External links
 Geoffrey Knauth's homepage
 LinkedIn profile
 Twitter profile
 Facebook page

Free software programmers
Members of the Free Software Foundation board of directors
GNU people
Lycoming College faculty
Harvard University alumni
Living people
Year of birth missing (living people)